Willemia is a genus of springtails in the family Hypogastruridae. There are at least 40 described species in Willemia.

Species
These 42 species belong to the genus Willemia:

 Willemia annapurna D'Haese & Weiner, 1998 i c g
 Willemia anophthalma Börner, 1901 i c g
 Willemia arenicola Palacios-Vargas & Vàzquez, 1989 i c g
 Willemia arida Fjellberg, 1991 i c g
 Willemia aspinata Stach, 1949 i c g
 Willemia bedosae D'Haese, 1998 i c g
 Willemia bellingeri Palacios-Vargas & Vàzquez, 1989 i c g
 Willemia brevispina Hüther, 1962 i c g
 Willemia buddenbrocki Hüther, 1959 i c g
 Willemia bulbosa Bonet, 1945 i c g
 Willemia christianseni D'Haese, 1998 i c g
 Willemia deharvengi D'Haese & Weiner, 1998 i c g
 Willemia delamarei Prabhoo, 1971 i c g
 Willemia denisi Mills, 1932 i c g
 Willemia dubia Christiansen & Bellinger, 1980 i c g
 Willemia fjellbergi Potapov in Babenko, Chernova, Potapov & Stebaeva, 1994 i c g
 Willemia granulata Fjellberg, 1985 i c g
 Willemia intermedia Mills, 1934 i c g
 Willemia japonica Yosii, 1970 i c g
 Willemia koreana Thibaud & Lee, 1994 i c g
 Willemia meybholae Palacios-Vargas, 1987 i c g
 Willemia multilobata Gers & Deharveng, 1985 i c g
 Willemia nadchatrami Yosii, 1959 i c g
 Willemia namibiae Thibaud & Massoud, 1988 i c g
 Willemia neocaledonica Weiner, 1991 i c g
 Willemia nepalensis D'Haese & Weiner, 1998 i c g
 Willemia persimilis Bonet, 1945 i c g
 Willemia psammophila Palacios & Thibaud, 2001 i c g
 Willemia scandinavica Stach, 1949 i c g
 Willemia setonychia Prabhoo, 1971 i c g
 Willemia shanghaiensis Yue, 1999 i c g
 Willemia similis Mills, 1934 i c g
 Willemia subbulbosa Thibaud, 1994 i c g
 Willemia tali Kaprus & Nevo, 2003 i c g
 Willemia tondoh g
 Willemia trilobata Barra, 1995 i c g
 Willemia trisphaerae Potapov in Babenko, Chernova, Potapov & Stebaeva, 1994 i c g
 Willemia unispina Fjellberg, 2007 g
 Willemia virae Kaprus, 1997 i c g
 Willemia wandae Tamura & Zhao, 1997 i c g
 Willemia zeppelini g
 Willemia zhaoi Tamura, Yin & Weiner, 2000 i c g

Data sources: i = ITIS, c = Catalogue of Life, g = GBIF, b = Bugguide.net

References

Further reading

 
 
 

Collembola